Roland Mayer may refer to:

 Roland Mayer, member of the Red Army Faction
 Roland Mayer, co-creator of the Gumpert Apollo and former chief of Audi Sport